Worcester Hydra was an American soccer team based in Worcester, Massachusetts, United States. Founded in 2011, the team played in the USL Premier Development League (PDL), the fourth tier of the American Soccer Pyramid, in the Northeast Division of the Eastern Conference. The team played its home games at Foley Stadium in Worcester, Massachusetts.

History

Worcester began their inaugural season in May 2012, playing at Foley Stadium. They appointed former US international player, and former Holy Cross head coach, Elvis Comrie, as head coach. Their first game was against Seacoast United Phantoms, which ended in a 1-0 defeat for the Hydra. Worcester gained their first-ever win, and first-ever goals, in a 2-0 victory over Boston Victory, both goals being scored by forward Alencar Junior.  However, following the 2012 season, the Hydra announced it would not be returning to the PDL for the 2013 season, citing financial issues.

Year-by-year

Squad

Players

As of May 5, 2012.

References

 
2011 establishments in Massachusetts
2012 disestablishments in Massachusetts
Association football clubs established in 2011
Association football clubs disestablished in 2012
Defunct soccer clubs in Massachusetts
Sports teams in Worcester, Massachusetts
USL League Two teams